Maximiliano Brito Hernández (born 19 July 1991) is a Uruguayan professional footballer who plays as a forward for Brown.

Career
Brito's senior career got underway in Uruguay with Rampla Juniors. The forward made twenty-three appearances across the 2010–11 and 2011–12 seasons, notably scoring four goals in the latter as the club were relegated to the Segunda División. Brito spent the first half of the subsequent 2012–13 out on loan with Olimpo in Argentina, though wouldn't feature competitively in Primera B Nacional. He returned to his parent team in January 2013, with sixteen games and five goals arriving in Uruguay's second tier. Brito was loaned to Patriotas on 19 July 2013. He scored on his first start versus Cúcuta Deportivo.

After further goals in Colombia against Deportes Tolima, Atlético Nacional and Atlético Huila across two campaigns with the Categoría Primera A outfit, Brito made a return to Argentina after agreeing terms with CAI of Torneo Federal A. Four goals, including a brace over Independiente, occurred in 2014. January 2015 saw Primera B Metropolitana side Brown sign Brito. He scored three goals in his first four appearances, which preceded him netting in eight further fixtures as they won the title. Brito switched tier three for Primera B Nacional in January 2016, as he completed a loan move to Nueva Chicago.

Brito, having played two seasons with Nueva Chicago, spent 2017–18 split across the second and third tiers in Argentina with Deportivo Morón and Acassuso; netting one and three goals respectively. On 2 July 2018, Brito agreed a fourth loan away from Brown as he signed with Deportivo Riestra in Primera B Metropolitana. He made his bow in a home victory over Comunicaciones on 18 August. He remained for two seasons in total, making thirty-two appearances and scoring two goals.

Career statistics
.

Honours
Brown
Primera B Metropolitana: 2015

References

External links

1991 births
Living people
Footballers from Montevideo
Uruguayan footballers
Association football forwards
Uruguayan expatriate footballers
Expatriate footballers in Argentina
Expatriate footballers in Colombia
Uruguayan expatriate sportspeople in Argentina
Uruguayan expatriate sportspeople in Colombia
Uruguayan Primera División players
Uruguayan Segunda División players
Categoría Primera A players
Torneo Federal A players
Primera B Metropolitana players
Primera Nacional players
Rampla Juniors players
Olimpo footballers
Patriotas Boyacá footballers
Comisión de Actividades Infantiles footballers
Club Atlético Brown footballers
Nueva Chicago footballers
Deportivo Morón footballers
Club Atlético Acassuso footballers
Deportivo Riestra players